Hobart Wade Lytal (October 30, 1909 – August 20, 1990) was an American football player and coach.
He served as the head football coach at Tarleton State University in Stephenville, Texas from 1967 to 1969, compiling a record of 4–24.
The high school football stadium in Quinlan, Texas is named in his honor.

References

External links
 

1909 births
1990 deaths
Austin Kangaroos football players
Tarleton State Texans football coaches
High school football coaches in Texas
People from Hunt County, Texas
Players of American football from Texas
Sportspeople from the Dallas–Fort Worth metroplex